In ancien regime France, papier timbré (stamped paper) was paper with a special revenue stamp that was compulsory for all authentic acts (i.e., documents used in law, such as wills, sale contracts and vital records). The tax on it, known as the timbre fiscal fixe or entier fiscal (sometimes also known as the papier timbré tax as a metonym), was one of the two forms of the timbre fiscal (the other was the timbre fiscal mobile).

The Revolt of the papier timbré in 17th century Brittany arose from resistance to the papier timbré tax.

See also
Stamp duty in the United Kingdom

References

Economic history of the Ancien Régime